Natural Act is the third and final duet album by Kris Kristofferson and Rita Coolidge, released in 1978 on A&M Records. The couple would divorce the following year.  The album was released while Coolidge's career was at a peak; her recent albums Anytime...Anywhere and Love Me Again had seen much commercial success. Natural Act is Kristofferson's only album to chart in the United Kingdom.

Background
When the couple recorded their first duet album Full Moon in 1973, Kristofferson was the bigger recording star, having won several awards for his songwriting and scoring a massive hit with “Why Me” from his gold selling LP Jesus Was a Capricorn, while Coolidge was still developing as an artist.  By 1978, however, Coolidge hit number 6 on the Billboard 100 with the platinum selling Anytime…Anywhere, an album that spawned three Top 20 hits.  Although he was now an established film star, Kristofferson’s previous album, Easter Island, was a commercial disappointment.  The couple’s marriage was floundering by this time - in the A&E episode of Biography about his life, Kristofferson admits to having a steamy love affair with costar Sarah Miles on the set of 1976's The Sailor Who Fell from Grace with the Sea - and Natural Act would be their final studio album together.

Recording and composition
Natural Act was recorded at Sunset Sound and was produced by David Anderle, who had produced their first duet album and several solo albums since.  Musically, the album leaned more to pop than rock and featured relaxed southern boogie, nostalgic pop ballads and country-tinged numbers alongside more unusual choices such as a reworking of "I Fought the Law," a hit for The Bobby Fuller Four in 1966, which found them sounding like the Everly Brothers.

With the couple's marriage disintegrating, several cuts carry a wistful poignancy, such as "Love Don’t Live Here Anymore" and the two older Kristofferson compositions, "Please Don’t Tell Me How the Story Ends", which had been a hit for Ray Price, and the regretful "Loving You Was Easier (Than Anything I'll Ever Do Again)", which Willie Nelson covered the following year on his Sings Kristofferson LP. The dour tone of these songs was reflected on the album cover; photographed by Annie Leibovitz, gone were the carefree unkempt lovers pictured on the first two album sleeves and in their place were two separate individuals wearing smart clothes and strained faces.

Reception
Natural Act was not a commercial success, failing to crack the Billboard 100 and or the country Top 20.  AllMusic: “…unlike the first two albums, Kristofferson didn't seem to be making much of an effort as a vocalist, while Coolidge just seemed listless. Natural Act sounded like a contractual obligation record from a musical act that had lost the chemistry that fueled it early on, just as the marriage apparently had.”  Kristofferson biographer Stephen Miller is more positive, calling the songs “reasonably strong” and adding that the collection “could hold its own against much of the lighter pop material in the charts in the late Seventies.”

Track listing
"Blue as I Do" (Stephen Bruton) – 2:53
"Not Everyone Knows" (Robert "Rob Dog" Morrison, Billy Swan) – 3:08
"I Fought the Law" (Sonny Curtis) – 2:27
"Number One" (Sonny Curtis, Billy Swan) – 2:35
"You're Gonna Love Yourself (In the Morning)" (Donnie Fritts) – 2:54
"Loving You Was Easier (Than Anything I'll Ever Do Again)" (Kristofferson) – 4:09
"Back in My Baby's Arms" (T-Bone Burnett) – 2:59
"Please Don't Tell Me How the Story Ends" (Kristofferson) – 2:23
"Hoola Hoop" (T-Bone Burnett, John Fleming, Roscoe West) – 3:51
"Love Don't Live Here Anymore" (Kristofferson) – 3:47
"Silver Mantis" (T-Bone Burnett) – 5:35

Personnel
 Kris Kristoffersen – vocals
 Rita Coolidge – vocals
 Stephen Bruton – guitar, background vocals
 Jerry McGee – guitar
 Dennis Belfield – bass
 Donnie Fritts – keyboards
 Michael Utley – keyboards, background vocals
 Billy Swan – background vocals
 Sammy Creason – drums
 Horns arranged by Mike Utley and Darrell Leonard
 Strings arranged by Gene Page
 Saxophone solo on "Number One" by Jerry Jumonville

Production
Produced by: David Anderle
Recorded and mixed by: Kent Nebergall
Assistant engineer: Peggy McCreary
Recorded at: Sunset Sound Recorders, Los Angeles
Mastered at: The Mastering Lab by Mike Reese
Production assistant: Ellen Vogt
Album art direction: Roland Young
Album design: Junie Osaki
Photography: Francesco Scavullo & Annie Leibovitz
Direction: Bert Block Management, Ridgefield, Conn.

Charts

References

1978 albums
Kris Kristofferson albums
Rita Coolidge albums
Albums arranged by Gene Page
Albums produced by David Anderle
Albums recorded at Sunset Sound Recorders
A&M Records albums
Vocal duet albums